Monica Pineas, commonly known as Top Cheri, (born 1991) at the coastal town of Walvis Bay, she is a Namibian singer and entrepreneur.

Early life
Born and raised in Walvis Bay, she remained to be the only girl amongst the seven boys, after her only sister died. Top Cheri was in a graduate school at the time in Windhoek. She was studying TV Production at the College of The Arts. Top Cheri opted to quit, in the aftermath of her sister's untimely death. She was in her second year and her late sister who was an entrepreneur and author from Walvis Bay was her only source of support. . Growing up, Top Cheri was a shy girl.

Musical career 
She didn't realize she was cut out for a music career because of it. Getting into the industry, the singer went to perform in German. She has won several SANLAM and MTC Awards. Her most recent was the Namibian song of the year in August 2020.

Projects 
The 'Omapendafule' hitmaker came up with a event, which was slated for 3 December 2022 at the Doc Jubber fields in Olympia, Windhoek, was a platform for young children to showcase their talent in singing, dancing and acting.

The event aimed at encouraging young people to become entrepreneurs, through the addition of stalls.

In addition to her upcoming album launch 'Fertile' , Top Cheri had also been laying the groundwork for a new project which  saw her giving back to the community. “I want people to look at cancer and see the real urgency behind it. People are dying every day but in some of our communities some of our people take it as witchcraft and by the time doctors get involved, it's too late.”

The cause is certainly close to her heart. “My mom had cancer, my best friend's mother died from cancer, I've seen it and what it does to people.” The cancer awareness project was  launched at the album shower where Top Cheri encouraged her peers in attendance to also get involved.

Interests 
Topcheri is more interests in making music(singing), playing dramas and making comedies.

Discography
Ghetto Love 2021

Tithe 2020

The Matrimony 2019

Dual 2021

Fertile 2022

References

1991 births
21st-century Namibian women singers
People from Walvis Bay
Living people

Namibian women
Namibian artists
Namibian singers